Casperia is a  (municipality) in the Province of Rieti in the Italian region of Latium, located about  northeast of Rome and about  southwest of Rieti.

The municipality of Casperia contains the frazioni (subdivisions, mainly villages and hamlets) Santa Maria in Legarano, San Vito di Casperia, and Paranzano.

Casperia borders the following municipalities: Cantalupo in Sabina, Contigliano, Montasola, Rieti, Roccantica, Torri in Sabina.

Among the church buildings are the Santissima Annunziata, San Giovanni Battista, Santa Maria in Legarano, Madonna della Neve, San Vito Martire, and the church and convent of San Salvatore.

Demographic evolution

References

External links
 

Cities and towns in Lazio
Hilltowns in Lazio